Ariel Troster is a politician in Ottawa, Ontario, Canada. She is the city councillor for Somerset Ward on Ottawa City Council.

Background
Prior to being elected, Troster had a long professional career, working for the Federation of Canadian Municipalities, Public Service Alliance of Canada, and The Council of Canadians. She has a bachelor's degrees in journalism and history from Concordia University and a master's degree in women's studies from the University of Ottawa. She is Jewish.

Politics
Troster was elected in the 2022 Ottawa municipal election. She was endorsed by outgoing councillor and mayoral candidate Catherine McKenney. Troster is second consecutive LGBT councillor to represent Somerset Ward.

Electoral record

|-
!rowspan="2" colspan="2"|Candidate
!colspan="3"|Popular vote
!rowspan="2" colspan="2"|Expenditures
|-
! Votes
! %
! ±%
|-
| style="background-color:#ED396D;" |
| style="text-align:left;"  | Ariel Troster
| style="text-align:right;" | 8,669
| style="text-align:right;" | 61.28
| style="text-align:right;" | –
| style="text-align:right;" |
|-
| style="background-color:#187B3E;" |
| style="text-align:left;"  | Stuart MacKay
| style="text-align:right;" | 4,706
| style="text-align:right;" | 33.29
| style="text-align:right;" | –
| style="text-align:right;" |
|-
| style="background-color:#A10B0A;" |
| style="text-align:left;"  | Brandon Russell
| style="text-align:right;" | 768
| style="text-align:right;" | 5.43
| style="text-align:right;" | –
| style="text-align:right;" |
|-
| style="text-align:right;background-color:#FFFFFF;" colspan="2" |Total valid votes
| style="text-align:right;background-color:#FFFFFF;" | 14,137
| style="text-align:right;background-color:#FFFFFF;" | 95.31
| style="text-align:right;background-color:#c2c2c2;" colspan="2" |
|-
| style="text-align:right;background-color:#FFFFFF;" colspan="2" |Total rejected, unmarked and declined votes
| style="text-align:right;background-color:#FFFFFF;" | 695
| style="text-align:right;background-color:#FFFFFF;" | 4.69
| style="text-align:right;background-color:#c2c2c2;" colspan="2" |
|-
| style="text-align:right;background-color:#FFFFFF;" colspan="2" |Turnout
| style="text-align:right;background-color:#FFFFFF;" | 14,832
| style="text-align:right;background-color:#FFFFFF;" | 45.24
| style="text-align:right;background-color:#FFFFFF;" | +6.14
| style="text-align:right;background-color:#c2c2c2;" |
|- 
| style="text-align:right;background-color:#FFFFFF;" colspan="2" |Eligible voters
| style="text-align:right;background-color:#FFFFFF;" | 32,787
| style="text-align:right;background-color:#c2c2c2;" colspan="3" |
|- 
| style="text-align:left;" colspan="6" |Note: Candidate campaign colours are based on the prominent colour used in campaign items (signs, literature, etc.)and are used as a visual differentiation between candidates.
|- 
| style="text-align:left;" colspan="13" |Sources:
|}

References

Living people
Ottawa city councillors
Women municipal councillors in Canada
21st-century Canadian women politicians
21st-century Canadian LGBT people
LGBT municipal councillors in Canada
University of Ottawa alumni
Concordia University alumni
1970s births 
Jewish Canadian politicians
Jewish women politicians
LGBT Jews
21st-century Canadian politicians